The Ebony Tower (1974) by John Fowles is a collection of five novellas and short stories with interlacing themes, each built around a medieval myth: The Ebony Tower, Eliduc, Poor Koko, The Enigma and The Cloud.

Plot synopses

The Ebony Tower

Henry Breasley is an elderly painter whose secluded retirement is invaded by a brash young artist commissioned to write a biographical study of the great man. Breasley shares his home with two young English girls, both former art students, Diana and Anne. In this strange ménage, David is left in no doubt about his host's views on modern abstract art. However, he is puzzled by the old man's relationship with the girls, especially when he himself is attracted to Diana.

Eliduc

Eliduc, the shortest tale in the book, is a translation of a Breton lai by Marie de France, in which a hero goes into exile in England, leaving his wife behind. While in exile, he falls for the daughter of a local king. The story is deliberately placed after The Ebony Tower as a clear parallel of and influence on the title story.

Poor Koko

An elderly writer has borrowed a country cottage from friends in London. On the first night of his stay, the house is burgled. Poor Koko tells of his encounter with the burglar.

The Enigma

John Fielding, British Member of Parliament, disappears without trace. Was foul play involved, or did he fake his own disappearance? The case presents few clues for the police officer in charge.

The Cloud

A seemingly idyllic picnic in the south of France for a group of English family and friends hides deeper, troubled undercurrents.

Television adaptations

The Ebony Tower (1984)

The Ebony Tower is a 1984 television film adaptation of the novelette by John Fowles. Directed by Robert Knights it stars Laurence Olivier in the role of the elderly painter.

Cast
 Laurence Olivier - Henry Breasley
 Roger Rees - David Williams
 Greta Scacchi - Diana, 'The Mouse'
 Toyah Willcox - Anne, 'The Freak'
 Georgina Melville - Beth Williams
 Yves Brainville - Jean-Pierre
 Denise Bailly - Mathilde
 Vincent Lindon

Trivia
 Olivier was recovering from pleurisy during filming.
 Filmed in Limoges, Haute-Vienne in France.

DVD and VHS
The film was released on VHS during the 1990s. It has been released on DVD format and is included on the Laurence Olivier Presents Collection and The Laurence Olivier Centenary Collection.

The Enigma (1980)

The Enigma is a 1980 television adaptation of the novelette by John Fowles, produced as part of BBC2's playhouse series. It was also directed by Robert Knights.

Cast
 Neville Barber - Chairman of Labour Meeting
 Philip Bowen - Peter Fielding
 Melinda Clancy - Caroline Fielding
 Shelley Crowhurst - Francesca Fielding
 Andrew Downie - Drummond
 John Franklyn-Robbins - John Marcus Fielding
 Lyndam Gregory - Peter's flat-mate
 Nigel Hawthorne - Fenton
 Ursula Howells - Mrs. Fielding
 Barbara Kellerman - Isobel Dodgson
 Elizabeth Spriggs - Miss Parsons
 Michael Thomas - Michael Jennings
 David Troughton - Andrews
 Raymond Westwell - Len Bargate
 Douglas Wilmer - Henry Wild

References

External links

FowlesBooks.com—The Official John Fowles web site
 
 

1974 British novels
1980 television films
1980 films
1984 television films
1984 films
British television films
English-language books
Jonathan Cape books
Novels by John Fowles
Novels about artists
British novels adapted into films
1980s English-language films